Thomas Griffin Dunne (born June 8, 1955) is an American actor, film producer, and film director. Dunne studied acting at The Neighborhood Playhouse School of the Theatre in New York City. He is known for portraying Jack Goodman in An American Werewolf in London (1981) and Paul Hackett in After Hours (1985), for which he was nominated for the Golden Globe Award for Best Actor – Motion Picture Musical or Comedy.

Early life
Thomas Griffin Dunne was born in New York City, to Ellen Beatriz (née Griffin) and Dominick Dunne. Dunne has Irish and Mexican ancestry, his father was born and raised in an Irish Catholic family with his maternal grandfather an Irish-American and his maternal grandmother a Mexican who was from Sonora, Mexico.He is the older brother of Alexander and Dominique Dunne. His mother founded the victims' rights organization Justice for Homicide Victims after Dominique's murder in 1982. His father was a producer, writer, and actor. He is also a nephew of writers John Gregory Dunne and Joan Didion. Raised in Los Angeles, Dunne attended the Fay School in Southborough, Massachusetts  and then went to Fountain Valley School in Colorado Springs, Colorado where he developed an interest in acting, appearing in many school plays. He was scheduled to perform in a school production of Othello when on the eve of a performance, a teacher found him smoking marijuana. Dunne was immediately expelled, and moved back to New York soon afterwards to pursue his acting interests. He studied acting at the Neighborhood Playhouse School of the Theatre under Sanford Meisner.

Career

Acting
Dunne began his professional acting career at age 19 with a small supporting role in The Other Side of the Mountain in 1975. He has since appeared on both film and television, starring in An American Werewolf in London (1981) as Jack Goodman, Johnny Dangerously (1984) as Tommy Kelly, After Hours (1985) as Paul Hackett, Who's That Girl (1987) as Loudon Trott opposite Madonna, My Girl (1991) as Jake Bixler, Quiz Show (1994) as the Geritol Account Executive, Game 6 (2005) as Elliott Litvak, and I Like It Like That (1994) as Stephen Price. Dunne also played Dr. Vass, opposite Matthew McConaughey, in the Oscar-nominated 2013 film Dallas Buyers Club.

Dunne's TV appearances include Frasier (pilot episode "The Good Son" as caller Russell, and in season 3 episode 11 "The Friend" as Bob), Saturday Night Live, Alias, and Law & Order: Criminal Intent (Episodes 5, 118, and 128). He portrayed Tony Mink in the comedy Trust Me on TNT. In 2012, Dunne guest-starred as management consultant Marco Pelios in seven episodes of the premiere season of the Showtime TV series House of Lies.

In 2018 he joined the cast of This is Us where he starred as Nicky Pearson, Jack Pearson's brother until the series concluded in 2022.

Producing
In 1995, Griffin Dunne was nominated for an Academy Award for Best Live Action Short Film for Duke of Groove, which he directed and co-wrote. He shared the nomination with producer Thom Colwell. Along with his producing partner, actress/producer Amy Robinson, he has produced several films including Baby It's You, After Hours, Running on Empty and Game 6 through their company, Double Play Productions. In 1986, the company had signed an agreement with Metro-Goldwyn-Mayer for a two-year production agreement.

Directing
Dunne's directorial debut was the 1995 short film Duke of Groove. Since then, he has directed five feature films, including Addicted to Love (1997) and Practical Magic (1998). He also directed one segment of the 2012 anthology film Movie 43. Dunne produced and directed Joan Didion: The Center Will Not Hold (2017), a documentary about his aunt, author Joan Didion, whom Dunne interviews and appears with on screen.

Personal life
From 1989 to 1995, he was married to American actress Carey Lowell, with whom he has one daughter, actress Hannah Dunne.

In July 2009, he married Anna Bingemann, an Australian stylist.

Filmography

Film

Television

Awards and nominations

References

External links

1955 births
20th-century American male actors
21st-century American male actors
Male actors from New York City
American male film actors
American male screenwriters
American male television actors
American television directors
Film directors from New York City
Film producers from New York (state)
Living people
Screenwriters from New York (state)
American people of Irish descent
American people of Mexican descent
American actors of Mexican descent